Raymond Mertens (19 July 1933 – 9 January 2023) was a Belgian football player and manager who played as a goalkeeper.

References

1933 births
2023 deaths
People from Sint-Pieters-Leeuw
Belgian footballers
Footballers from Flemish Brabant
Association football goalkeepers
Belgian football managers
K.V. Kortrijk managers
Club Brugge KV head coaches